The 11th Alberta Legislative Assembly was in session from February 17, 1949, to July 3, 1952, with the membership of the assembly determined by the results of the 1948 Alberta general election held on August 17, 1948. The Legislature officially resumed on February 17, 1949, and continued until the fifth session was prorogued on April 10, 1952 and dissolved on July 3, 1952, prior to the 1952 Alberta general election.

Alberta's eleventh government was controlled by the majority Social Credit Party for the fourth time, led by Premier Ernest Manning who would go on to be the longest serving Premier in Alberta history. The Official Opposition was led by James Harper Prowse a member of the Alberta Liberal Party. The Speaker was Peter Dawson who would serve until his death during the 15th legislature on March 24, 1963.

The opposition was divided between the Liberal and Co-operative Commonwealth and 2 Independents.

Composition at election

Standings changes

References

Further reading

External links
Alberta Legislative Assembly
Legislative Assembly of Alberta Members Book
By-elections 1905 to present

11